The Mollie and Neel Glenn House is a historic house in Springfield, Tennessee, U.S..

The house was built for Neel Glenn and his wife, née Mollie Dulin, in 1906. Since Mollie's death in 1946, it has been owned by the Springfield Federation of Women's Clubs. It was used as a public library from 1946 to 1969.

The house was designed in the Colonial Revival architectural style, with elements of Italianate, Craftsman and Art Nouveau architecture. It has been listed on the National Register of Historic Places since July 25, 2012.

References

National Register of Historic Places in Robertson County, Tennessee
Neoclassical architecture in Tennessee
Houses completed in 1906
1906 establishments in Tennessee